Alternaria limicola is a plant pathogen affecting citruses. It is the cause of the Mancha foliar de los citricos disease.

See also
 List of citrus diseases

References

External links
 USDA ARS Fungal Database

limicola
Fungal citrus diseases
Fungi described in 1990